Jackass 3D (known as Jackass 3 on home media) is a 2010 American 3D reality comedy film directed by Jeff Tremaine. It is the third installment in the Jackass film series, and the sequel to Jackass Number Two (2006). The film stars the regular Jackass cast of  Johnny Knoxville, Bam Margera, Ryan Dunn, Steve-O, Dave England, Wee Man, Preston Lacy, Danger Ehren, and Chris Pontius. This is the last Jackass film to feature Dunn before his tragic death in 2011 and Margera as a primary cast member before his departure in 2020 (Margera is briefly in Jackass Forever). This is also the last Jackass film to feature a guest appearance by Rip Taylor, who died in October 2019.

The film was theatrically released in the United States in the 3D format on October 15, 2010, by Paramount Pictures, marking the tenth anniversary of the Jackass television series. It received generally positive reviews from critics. The film grossed $171.7 million worldwide against a production budget of $20 million. A sequel, titled Jackass Forever, was released on February 4, 2022 to positive reviews.

Unused material of the film was released on a separate movie titled Jackass 3.5, which was released on DVD and Blu-ray on June 14, 2011.

Synopsis

Beavis and Butt-Head open the film with a special cameo, and an explanation of 3D technology. In a matter typical for the characters, they start arguing and quickly get into a slap-fight, with several of the moves especially animated to come out of the screen in a 3D setting. The opening sequence features the members lining up, standing in each color of the rainbow while an operatic version of the Jackass theme song "Corona" plays. Once Johnny Knoxville introduces the film, each cast member does small stunts by various objects in slow-motion to "The Kids are Back" by Twisted Sister. The opening sequence, as well as many of the stunts, were filmed with Phantom high speed cameras which shoot at 1,000 frames per second.

The most notable stunts and pranks include; Johnny Knoxville being camouflage-painted as a bull charges at him, Bam Margera falling into a pit filled with snakes, Ryan Dunn playing the tuba while a male sheep rams him, Steve-O drinking Preston Lacy's sweat after riding an elliptical machine, Wee Man participating in a bar brawl with other little people, Preston Lacy getting a football kicked into his face by a professional NFL kicker, Chris Pontius flying an RC helicopter as it's tied to his penis, Ehren McGhehey getting his crooked tooth pulled by Bam's Lamborghini, and Dave England playing tetherball with a beehive against Steve-O.

The final stunt involves Steve-O being launched high into the air while inside a full port-a-potty connected to bungee cords. The following closing skit is done in a similar fashion as the introduction, as Knoxville announces he's about to "end the movie", then triggers an old-fashioned dynamite plunger; after the rest of the crew is disappointed by the initial explosion being a mere puff of air out of a nearby piñata, everything in the room is destroyed in a series of large explosions as the blown-up objects are thrown at the cast (like the opening, all shown in slow-motion) to the tune of Pyotr Ilyich Tchaikovsky's 1812 Overture. After the explosions are finished, the cast members are flushed away by a wave pool. As in the past two Jackass films, comedian Rip Taylor makes an appearance before the credits roll, celebrating the end of the film in overly dramatic fashion.

Cast
The entire cast from the previous movies returned for the third movie.
 Johnny Knoxville
 Bam Margera
 Ryan Dunn
 Steve-O
 Wee Man
 Preston Lacy
 Chris Pontius
 Danger Ehren
 Dave England
Guest appearances:
 The Dudesons
 Loomis Fall
 Brandon Novak
 April Margera, Phil Margera, and Jess Margera
 Rake Yohn
 Terra Jolé
 Mike Judge (as the voices of Beavis and Butt-head)
 Will Oldham
 Rip Taylor
 Half Pint Brawlers
 Will "The Farter" Bakey
 Animal experts Manny Puig, David Weathers, Jason Deeringer, and Jules Sylvester
 American Football players Erik Ainge, Jared Allen, and Josh Brown
 Wheelchair rugby player Mark Zupan
 Extreme sport athletes Mat Hoffman, Tony Hawk, Kerry Getz, Eric Koston and Parks Bonifay
 Actors Seann William Scott, Edward Barbanell, Jack Polick, John Taylor, Angie Simms and Dana Michael Woods
 From Nitro Circus; Andy Bell, Erik Roner and Tommy "Streetbike Tommy" Passemante
 From Weezer; Rivers Cuomo, Brian Bell and Scott Shriner
 Knoxville's daughter Madison and his son Rocko appear in the end credits

Crew 
Crew members who appear in this movie:
 Director and producer Jeff Tremaine
 Producer Spike Jonze
 Executive producer Trip Taylor
 Associate producer Greg Wolf
 Co-producer and cinematographer Dimitry Elyashkevich
 Co-producer and photographer Sean Cliver
 Cameramen Lance Bangs, Rick Kosick, and Greg Iguchi
 Boom operator Seamus Frawley
 Set decorator Mike Kassak
 Art directors and production designers J.P. Blackmon, and Seth Meisterman

Notable exceptions are former Jackass mainstays Brandon DiCamillo, who had a falling out with cast member Bam Margera, and Raab Himself, who was recovering from alcoholism and drug addiction.

Production

In December 2009, director Jeff Tremaine began doing camera tests with the 3D equipment. In that same month, Johnny Knoxville announced the return of the entire cast of the previous two movies. According to Deadline Hollywood, a stunt called "The Heli-cockter" was filmed and shown to Paramount executives in its 3D format to greenlight the project. Chris Pontius tethered a remote control-operated helicopter to his penis, and grinned while he swung it around.

Filming of the stunts began on January 25, 2010, Tremaine filmed the crew on private property unlike the traditional Jackass fashion of filming in the streets (although in the film, several skits/pranks were shot in public), and it includes "occasional forays to foreign countries." Bam Margera told the Artisan News Service that the movie was 70% done and half the crew had been to the hospital with Margera having "three broken ribs and a broken shoulder and a twisted ankle as we speak." During filming, recurring guest cast member Loomis Fall suffered a compound fracture of his clavicle after an improper landing during a stunt involving an umbrella and a jet engine.

On the subject of the stunts, director Jeff Tremaine said he was aiming to revamp most of the old stunts from the original show into the movie. For example, the "Poo Cocktail Supreme" is an homage to, and an extension of, the stunt originally done by Knoxville on the original television show. The stunt, "Lamborghini Tooth Pull" was originally shot for Jackass Number Two with Margera's uncle, Vincent Margera (also known as Don Vito) but after Margera's arrest back in 2006, the stunt was pulled from the final cut of the movie and was not shown in Jackass 2.5, so it was re-shot with Ehren McGhehey for this film, and the elder Margera was declared persona non grata among the cast and crew for  some time.

In April 2010, JackassWorld.com was officially shut down, leaving a posting that said "gone filmin'," and "Thanks for the support the past two years. To keep abreast and adick of all things related to the world of jackass and Dickhouse (including the currently in production flick jackass 3D), follow us on Facebook and Twitter." In an interview with Rick Kosick, he revealed that JackassWorld.com will no longer be a web site after the movie releases. Despite this claim, it was eventually relaunched as the main website for Dickhouse Productions.

Cameraman Lance Bangs explained the transition from television to cinema screen: "It's utterly crazy. Everything in 3-D looks as brightly colored as candy. I'm a cameraman on it, and it's amazing to watch the footage being turned 3-D, like watching everything through a viewfinder." He later went on to say, "I thought I was above peer pressure, but there's such camaraderie. I took part in a few stunts and ended up humiliated and hurt — me, the poetic film-maker friend of Spike Jonze."

In late May 2010, Knoxville stated that Steve-O's sobriety was at its best and, "there is no beer on set this time around even if some of us wish there was." He also said, "To be honest, it's going great. Everyone has had different injuries throughout, which is a good sign, and Steve-O is probably getting the best footage out of everybody. He is really going for it. He wants to prove to everyone he can do these stunts sober. It's been two years since he had a drink now. Everyone has been real supportive of him."

At the 2010 MTV Movie Awards, Tremaine said filming was nearly finished but they had not shot internationally yet but intended to shoot "a couple of bits".

An injury to cast member Bam Margera forced a rewrite for the beginning of the movie. On June 12, 2010, Margera was beaten on the head with a bat by a 59-year-old African-American woman outside of his bar, The Note. The woman alleged Bam called her a racial slur and that she was offended, but did not hit him. When Margera was approached by TMZ two days after the incident, he told them he "never used the n-word" and that "[the lady] attacked me times before". He explained:
                                                                                                                                                                                              I was internally bleeding in the brain for two days and they wouldn't let me leave the hospital. I was like, 'I need to go to Los Angeles in six hours to go finish Jackass.' We start tomorrow and I'm supposed to get hit in the head and now I can't because of her.

Margera added in the same interview that the opening sequence is being shot with Phantom high speed cameras, which record at 1,000 frames per second to produce hyper-slow motion, similar to the opening sequence of Zombieland. Appropriately, make-up effects designer Tony Gardner, creator of the zombie hordes for Zombieland, was a designer for all of the Jackass films.

Deleted scenes that were filmed, but got cut out of both Jackass 3D and Jackass 3.5 include: "BB Gun Nipple Piercing", where Wee Man shoots Steve-O in the nipple with a BB gun; "Bed Sled", where Chris Pontius and Dave England slide down a snowy mountain on an inflatable bed; "Soda Enema", where Johnny Knoxville puts peppermint candies in a cola bottle which then explodes into Bam Margera's anus; "Super Mighty Glue Goatee", where Knoxville puts super mighty glue on his chin and sticks it to Phil Margera's hairy chest; "Banana Gauntlet", where Wee Man, Dave, and Bam slide on a lubed up table with banana peels while they're dressed up as gorillas, and trying to avoid the bananas that are swinging in their way; and "Piss Drink", where Steve-O uses Knoxville's catheter for Knoxville's torn urethra as a straw to drink his piss. Some of these deleted scenes are briefly shown in the credits of Jackass 3D or Jackass 3.5. Steve-O uploaded the full "BB Gun Nipple Piercing" to his YouTube channel.

Release

Box office 
Jackass 3D earned $117.2 million in North America, and $53.1 million in other territories, for a worldwide total of $170.3 million. It is the highest-grossing film of the series worldwide and separately in North America and overseas.

In the United States, the film had a record opening day for a fall release movie ($22 million), and posted a record October midnight opening ($2.5 million). It then held the record for the highest opening weekend gross in the month of October as well as the Fall season ($50.4 million) for one year until Paranormal Activity 3 claimed it in 2011 with a weekend gross of $52.6 million. Based on early outperforming predictions it would earn $30 million. It marked the highest-grossing opening weekend of the franchise, ahead of Jackass: The Movie ($22.8 million) and Jackass Number Two ($29 million). 3D accounted for a whopping 90% of its opening weekend gross; however, it still improved on the attendance of its predecessors. It then earned $65.6 million in its first week, which marked the largest Fall opening week of all time. It closed in theaters on January 20, 2011, with $117.2 million. The film made more overseas than both its predecessors combined. Its highest-grossing country, outside North America, was Australia ($9.9 million).

Critical response 
Rotten Tomatoes gives the film an approval rating of 65% based on 110 reviews, and an average rating of 5.9/10. The website's critical consensus reads: "The Jackass gang might be running out of gross-out stunts, but this installment contains plenty of brilliantly brain-dead comedy – and the 3-D adds a pungent new dimension." Metacritic gives the film a weighted average score of 56 out of 100, based on 23 critics, indicating "mixed or average reviews". Audiences polled by CinemaScore gave the film an average grade of "B+" on an A+ to F scale.

Owen Gleiberman of Entertainment Weekly gave the film a B grade. He notes that the audience wants to see Knoxville and the boys top themselves, and ultimately they achieve that. Gleiberman described the 3D as "the usual big nothing" and fails entirely to make the film any more disgusting.
Washington Post critic Dan Kois described the film as "a touching ode to male friendship at its most primal" and describes the atmosphere as one of "infectious bonhomie". He sarcastically asks viewers if they are "highbrow" enough for Jackass 3D. He notes the apprehension of the performers before the stunts is nearly as exciting as the stunts themselves. Kois shows his appreciation not just for the stunts but also the way in which they are repeated in slow motion. He gives the film 3/4 stars. Michael Phillips of the Chicago Tribune criticizes the film describing it as "reductive, insanely violent slapstick" but he accepts that is the idea. Roger Moore of the Orlando Sentinel complains that the performers "aren't getting better, they're getting older" and the stunts that were cute ten years ago now seem forced and a little desperate.

Home media
The DVD and Blu-ray versions of Jackass 3D were released on March 8, 2011, in three different versions. The first version is a Blu-ray/DVD combo pack with a digital copy; the second is a limited-edition two-disc DVD pack, and the third copy is a single-disc DVD. The special features on the Blu-ray/DVD combo pack include 11 deleted scenes and 29 outtakes, while the DVD versions include 2 deleted scenes and 5 outtakes. All versions include the MTV making-of special and a trailer. With the Blu-ray/DVD combo pack and the limited edition two-disc DVD pack, the second disc includes an anaglyphic 3D version of the movie (four pairs of glasses were provided). No true Blu-ray 3D version has been made available to date. Jackass 3D is exclusively available for rent on 3DTVs which support the 3DGO! streaming app, as well as through VR platforms through Bigscreen VR.

Jackass 3.5

Jackass 3.5 was a direct-to-home media version with additional footage. The film was compiled from outtakes shot during the making of the third film, and released in weekly installments on Joost from April 1 through June 13, 2011. The first trailer was originally released online on January 27, 2011, and the feature-length movie was released on Blu-ray and DVD on June 14, 2011, less than a week before Ryan Dunn's death.

Added stunts include:

 Alligator Snapping Turtle – Steve-O gets his backside bit by an alligator snapping turtle.
 Fat Fuck Fall Down – Bam Margera hangs on to a branch on a tree in a fat suit, he lets go of the branch and falls crotch-first onto a lower branch into the snow.
 Barrel Surfing – Chris Pontius, Steve-O, Bam Margera and Ryan Dunn take turns surfing on barrels downhill.
 Chair Kick – Bam Margera kicks the hind leg of the chair Ryan Dunn is sitting on, cinematographer Dimitry Elyashkevich then does the same to Bam.
 Snapping Turtle on a Stick – Johnny Knoxville has a snapping turtle taped on a stick and he tries to get it to bite Ehren McGhehey.
 Ghetto Defibrillators – Bam Margera and Ryan Dunn wake up Ehren McGhehey by shocking him with defibrillators.
 Fight – Ehren McGhehey tries to get even with Bam Margera, but he fails and they end up legitimately fighting each other.
 Miniature Cannon – Johnny Knoxville shoots Loomis Fall and Ehren McGhehey with a miniature cannon.
 Slip N' Bowl – Street Bike Tommy goes down a slide dressed as a bowling ball while the rest of the guys, excluding Johnny Knoxville, stand in his way dressed pins. Meanwhile, Knoxville shoots the guys with paintballs from an RC helicopter.
 Rocket Ass – Bam Margera gets hit in his backside by a dildo rocket.
 Magna Goggles – The guys attempt various stunts while wearing binoculars, such as hammering a nail, trying to catch a football and running on chairs.
 Snow Tubing – The guys perform various stunts in the snow with The Dudesons.
 The Blowback – Bam Margera and Ryan Dunn run into a wooden pole while holding a long stick on either side. Dunn later attempts this with Johnny Knoxville, where Knoxville suffers an injury after he legitimately slices his hand open.
 Doo Doo Falls – Brandon Novak goes down a ramp on a toilet.
 Kissing Booth – Preston Lacy gets hit on his head with a ball attached to bungee cord by Mark Zupan.
 Tennis Balls – Johnny Knoxville throws a tennis ball at Wee Man's testicles from behind in super slow-motion.
 Paint Balloons – Dave England gets balloons filled with paint thrown at him in super slow-motion.
 Going Fishing – Johnny Knoxville hits Ehren McGhehey on his head and genitals with a large fish.
 Drywall Drop In – Bam Margera drops in on a ramp with a skateboard and smashes through four drywalls.
 Bareback Base Jump – Dave England jumps off the back of a sprinting horse with Judd Leffew.
 Tennis Ball Nut Shot – Bam Margera hits a tennis ball on Ryan Dunn's genitals.
 Bombs Away – The guys mix cola and peppermint candies together, they throw the bottles on the ground creating cola explosions and causing the bottles to fly in all directions at high speed.
 Invisible Wee – Wee Man scares Brandon Novak as he is camouflage-painted in the Margeras' stairwell. Ryan Dunn proceeds to shock Wee Man with a cattle prod.
 Rat Zapper – Steve-O gets his testicles electrocuted by an electric rat trap.
 Belt Sander Skates – Brandon Novak uses belt sanders to try to roller skate with them.
 Fat Kathy – Spike Jonze is dressed as a fat old lady named Kathy, and goes on to pull pranks in public.
 Double Flying Head Kick – Bam Margera kicks Dave England in his left shoulder with both feet, later Dave gets his revenge by kicking Bam in the head with two feet.
 Enema Long Jump – Ehren McGhehey, Chris Pontius, Steve-O and Dave England insert two enemas each and then they go long jumping.
 Treadmill Shit Show – The guys perform various stunts with skateboards and treadmills.
 Human Cheetah – Wee Man gets shot on his body by paintballs, with the bruises leaving spots everywhere resembling a cheetah.
 Winter Fat Fucks – Ryan Dunn, Dave England, Bam Margera and Erik Roner go snowboarding, skiing and tubing while in a fat suit.
 Woodpecker – Chris Pontius gets pecked on his penis by a woodpecker.
 The Yoga Ball – Wee Man goes inside a bullring with a yoga ball as a bull charges towards him.
 Flaming Gauntlet – Steve-O walks on a balance beam above fire while lit sandbags are swinging at him.
 Dildo Bazooka – Brandon Novak gets shot in his backside by a dildo bazooka.
 Flying Nut High Five – Bam Margera and Ryan Dunn attempt to knock their nuts together in mid air.
 Moto Base Jump – Dave England and Andy Bell base jump off of a high speed motorbike while airborne.
 Ball Way – The guys attempt to surf in a hallway full of balls.
 Electric Limbo – Johnny Knoxville, Wee Man, Loomis Fall and Dave England attempt to go under an electrically-charged limbo bar. Steve-O later licks the bar.
 Penis Costume – Chris Pontius performs stunts which involve his penis dressed in a mouse costume, such as putting his penis in a rat trap and having a cat "play" with it.
 Triple Train Horn – Johnny Knoxville scares Priya Swaminathan with a hidden triple train horn in her office.
 Changed Sunscreen – Ryan Dunn and Bam Margera prank Johnny Knoxville by putting horse semen in his prescription lotion.
 Fart Darts – Will the Farter farts darts out of his ass with a dart gun at Steve-O's face.
 Basketball Nut Shots – The guys throw basketballs at each other's genitals from a great distance.

In describing the sequel in an interview conducted prior to Jackass 3Ds theatrical release, Johnny Knoxville said, "We shot two movies worth of material." Originally, Knoxville said the film might be ready for a Christmas 2010 DVD release, but it was reported in late October that the film would not be released until after Christmas.

The television premiere for Jackass 3.5 was June 9 on MTV, which was followed by an encore on MTV2 on June 10. Notably, it was shown on November 28, 2011, after the Tribute to Ryan Dunn on MTV.

The DVD was released in Australia on August 3 as part of an eight-disc box-set which also includes the other movies, all three volumes of the television series and the Lost Tapes. The film was released as a separate disc on September 1. The set was also published in the United States & Canada in 2016, omitting the series (already released on DVD there), but including the 3 main films, as well as the three "Jackass .5" films, plus Jackass Presents: Bad Grandpa and its ".5" film.

Spin-off

In March 2012, Johnny Knoxville discussed the possibility of a fourth film, saying "we're keeping our mind open" and "I've got 50–60 ideas on top of all the stuff we didn't get to shoot." Then in June 2012, it was reported Paramount "registered several domains for a film that would be called Bad Grandpa."

During Bam Margera's September 18, 2012 interview on The Howard Stern Show about Jackass he said: "There's going to be a whole movie about Knoxville's grandpa character."

Bad Grandpa was officially announced in July 2013 and released on October 25, 2013, exactly 11 years after the release of the first film. The film was dedicated to cast member Ryan Dunn, who died in 2011 following a fatal car crash.

Soundtrack
Jackass 3D: Music from the Motion Picture was released via a link to Punknews.org on the official Jackass Facebook page. Karen O of the Yeah Yeah Yeahs returns again to contribute toward the soundtrack (like Jackass Number Two).

In August 2010, Rivers Cuomo confirmed that the song "Memories" performed by Weezer will be featured in the film.

CKY also announced that they created an exclusive track for the movie, titled "Afterworld". The single was released on September 30, 2010.

 "Corona" (Jackass Opera Mix) by Squeak E. Clean
 "The Kids Are Back" by Twisted Sister
 "If You're Gonna Be Dumb, You Gotta Be Tough" by Karen O
 "Memories" by Weezer
 "Party in My Pants" by Roger Alan Wade
 "Invisible Man" by Smut Peddlers
 "I'm Shakin'" by The Blasters
 "I Got Your Number" by Cock Sparrer
 "You Can't Roller Skate in a Buffalo Herd" by Roger Miller
 "Been Blown to Shreds" by Sassafras
 "Brand New Key" by Melanie
 "Alcohol" by Gang Green
 "Afterworld" by CKY

Sequel

A sequel to Jackass 3D, titled Jackass Forever, was released on February 4, 2022.

Notes

References

External links

 
 
 
 
 
 

2010 3D films
2010 comedy films
2010 films
American films with live action and animation
American comedy films
Beavis and Butt-Head
Dickhouse Productions films
2010s English-language films
Films based on television series
Films directed by Jeff Tremaine
Films with screenplays by Johnny Knoxville
Jackass (TV series)
Jackass (film series)
MTV Films films
Paramount Pictures films
2010s American films